Kelagar Mahalleh (also Romanized as Kelāgar Maḩalleh) is a village in Shahidabad Rural District, Bandpey-ye Gharbi District, Babol County, Mazandaran Province, Iran. At the 2006 census, its population was 476, in 119 families.

References 

Populated places in Babol County